Abraham Robinson McIlvaine (August 14, 1804 – August 22, 1863) was a Whig member of the U.S. House of Representatives from Pennsylvania.

Biography
Abraham R. McIlvaine was born in Ridley, Pennsylvania. He engaged in agricultural pursuits in Chester County, Pennsylvania.

He was a member of the Pennsylvania House of Representatives in 1836 and 1837. 

McIlvaine was elected as a Whig to the Twenty-eighth, Twenty-ninth, and Thirtieth Congresses. He served as chairman of the United States House Committee on Expenditures in the Department of War during the Twenty-eighth Congress.

An unsuccessful candidate for renomination in 1848, he resumed his agricultural interests and also engaged in the iron business.

He died on his estate, “Springton Manor Farm” in Chester County in 1863.  Interment in Caln Orthodox Quaker Meeting Burial Ground near Downingtown, Pennsylvania.  Reinterment in Northwood Cemetery in Downingtown.

References

Members of the Pennsylvania House of Representatives
American Quakers
1804 births
1863 deaths
Whig Party members of the United States House of Representatives from Pennsylvania
19th-century American politicians
People from Ridley Township, Pennsylvania
Burials in Pennsylvania